La ciutat cremada (The Burned City; Spanish title: La ciudad quemada) is a 1976 Spanish historical film directed by Antoni Ribas.

Cast

Plot
The story takes place in Barcelona following the disaster in Cuba until the Tragic Week (la Semana Trágica), approximately from 1899 until 1909, by means of events which befall a family in that city.

References

External links 

1970s historical films
Spanish multilingual films
Spanish historical films
1970s Spanish films